The 2004 European Road Championships were held in Otepää, Estonia between 6 August and 10 August 2004, regulated by the European Cycling Union. The event consisted of a road race and a time trial for men and women under 23.

Schedule

Individual time trial 
Friday 6 August 2004
 Women under-23, 23.1 km
 Men under-23, 30.5 km

Road race
Sunday 10 August 2004
 Women under-23, 119.2 km
 Men under-23, 178.8 km

Events summary

Medal table

References

External links
The European Cycling Union

European Road Championships, 2004
Road cycling
European Road Championships by year
International cycle races hosted by Estonia